Tamansari is an area in Bandung, Indonesia. It includes the  Bandung Zoo, Babakan Siliwangi, and Bandung Institute of Technology.

References 

Bandung